A hookah is an instrument for vaporizing and smoking flavored tobacco or sometimes cannabis or opium.

Hookah may also refer to:

 "Hookah" (song), by Tyga, 2014
 "Hookah" (Bad Gyal song), 2019
 A basic form of surface-supplied diving

See also
 
 Hooker (disambiguation)
 əkoostik hookah, a Columbus, Ohio jam band, hosts of the Hookahville music festival
 Hookah lounge, an establishment where patrons share hookah 
 Muʽassel, or shisha